Walter David Loveridge CMG (13 September 1867 – 6 January 1940) was an Australian cricketer, engineer and public service administrator.

Early life
Loveridge was born in Sydney and educated at Newington College (1880–1884).

Cricket
Loveridge played first-class cricket as a right-handed batsman and wicketkeeper for New South Wales in a single match in the 1902–03 season.

Public service career
Late in 1884, Loveridge entered the New South Wales Lands Department as a cadet draughtsman and remained in the state's public service until his retirement in 1930, due to ill health. From the position of inspector in the State  
Treasury, Loveridge was appointed a member of the New South Wales Public Service Board on 23 April 1920 and later served as chairman. In 1930 he was appointed a Companion of the Order of St Michael and St George for his service as President of the Sydney Harbour Trust (1924–1930).

See also
 List of New South Wales representative cricketers

References

Bibliography

1867 births
1940 deaths
People educated at Newington College
New South Wales cricketers
Companions of the Order of St Michael and St George
Australian cricketers